Michael Keogh (born October 13, 1950) is a retired Irish middle-distance runner. He competed at the 1972 Summer Olympics in the 5000 metres.

Keogh attended Essex Catholic High School and Manhattan College where he ran track for the Jaspers. Along with Anthony Colón, Keogh won the team 1973 NCAA Men's Division I Indoor Track and Field Championships and was part of the distance medley relay championship team.

References 

1950 births
Living people
Essex Catholic High School alumni
Irish male middle-distance runners
Manhattan Jaspers track and field athletes
Olympic athletes of Ireland
Athletes (track and field) at the 1972 Summer Olympics